Jaan Hünerson (4 February 1882 – 5 June 1942 Sosva, Sverdlovsk Oblast, Russian SFSR) was an Estonian agronomist and politician.

Political offices:
 1927–1928 Minister of Internal Affairs
 1929–1931 Minister of Education and Social Affairs
 1931 Minister of Justice and Internal Affairs
 1931–1932 Minister of Agriculture
 1932 Minister of Public Education and Social Affairs

References

1882 births
1942 deaths
People from Mulgi Parish
People from Kreis Pernau
Farmers' Assemblies politicians
Education and Social affairs ministers of Estonia
Ministers of the Interior of Estonia
Agriculture ministers of Estonia
Members of the Estonian Constituent Assembly
Members of the Riigikogu, 1920–1923
Members of the Riigikogu, 1923–1926
Members of the Riigikogu, 1926–1929
Members of the Riigikogu, 1929–1932
Members of the Riigikogu, 1932–1934
Estonian agronomists
University of Tartu alumni
Recipients of the Order of the White Star, 2nd Class
Estonian people executed by the Soviet Union
People who died in the Gulag